Riffian or Rifian may refer to:

Morocco
Riffians, a Berber people
Rifian language, their language
Riff languages, their language family
Rif, a mountainous area of Morocco

Italy
Riffian, South Tyrol, a municipality

Film
Rififi, a 1955 French film  

Language and nationality disambiguation pages

eo:Rifiano
pl:Rifiano